"Hanging On" is a song by American singer and songwriter Active Child from his debut studio album, You Are All I See (2011). It was written by Active Child and Ariel Rechtshaid, and produced by Rechtshaid. The song's music video, directed by T.S. Pfeffer and Robert McHugh, debuted on January 19, 2012. English singer Ellie Goulding covered "Hanging On" in 2012, while Australian alternative rock band Something for Kate included an acoustic cover of the song as a bonus track on the two-disc special edition of their 2012 album Leave Your Soul to Science.

Personnel
Credits adapted from the liner notes of You Are All I See.

 Active Child – vocals, additional engineering, production
 Ariel Rechtshaid – engineering, mixing, production
 David Schiffman – mixing
 Howie Weinberg – mastering

Ellie Goulding version

In 2012, "Hanging On" was covered by English singer and songwriter Ellie Goulding for her second studio album, Halcyon. An alternative version featuring English rapper Tinie Tempah was released as a free download on 10 July 2012 via Goulding's SoundCloud page, serving as a promotional single for the album. The accompanying music video was directed by Ben Newbury and released on 13 July.

Goulding's cover version was featured in the Gossip Girl episode "The Revengers", the Nikita episode "Til Death Do Us Part" and on the soundtrack to the 2013 film adaptation of The Host. In February 2013, the Living Phantoms remix of the song was used in the "From Ashes" live-action trailer for the PlayStation 3 video game God of War: Ascension. The remix of the song by I See MONSTAS was included on the soundtrack to the 2014 film adaption of Divergent in addition to the original version appearing in the film.

Credits and personnel
Credits adapted from the liner notes of Halcyon.

 Ellie Goulding – vocals
 Ben Baptie – mixing assistant
 Billboard – production
 Philippe Dumais – assistant engineering
 Tom Elmhirst – mixing
 Tinie Tempah – vocals
 Richard Vincent – engineering

Charts

Certifications

References

2011 songs
2012 singles
Ellie Goulding songs
Polydor Records singles
Song recordings produced by Billboard (record producer)
Songs written by Ariel Rechtshaid
Tinie Tempah songs
Songs written by Tinie Tempah
Song recordings produced by Ariel Rechtshaid